Satyrium macrophyllum is a species of orchid occurring from Kenya to South Africa.

References 

macrophyllum
Orchids of South Africa
Orchids of Kenya